Arthur Sserwanga is a Ugandan  accountant, academic, and academic administrator. He was appointed Vice Chancellor of Muteesa I Royal University in September 2014, a private university in Uganda.  He previously served as the dean of the Faculty of Commerce at Makerere University Business School (MUBS).

Education

He obtained a Diploma in Education in 1994 from the Institute of Teacher Education Kyambogo, a precursor to Kyambogo University. He also holds the degree of Bachelor of Business Administration, obtained from MUBS in 1998. His degree of Master of Science in Accounting and Finance was obtained in 2001 from MUBS. His degree of Doctor of Philosophy in Entrepreneurship was obtained in 2010, also from MUBS.

Work history

Sserwanga is a professor at Makerere University Business School.Sserwanga's first job, from 1994 until 1998, was as an instructor at the City Institute of Business Studies in Kampala, Uganda's capital and largest city. From 1998 until 1999, he worked as a Graduate fellow in the Faculty of Commerce at MUBS. From 1999 until 2003, he was an assistant lecturer, and from 2003 until 2006, he was a lecturer, in the department of accounting. Between 2004 and 2014, he held different positions at MUBS, including: (a) head of the department of accounting - 2004 to 2008 (b) director, Directorate for Vocational and Distance Education - 2008 to 2009 (c) dean, Faculty of Vocational and Distance Education - 2009 to 2011 and (d) dean, Faculty of Commerce - 2011 to 2014. In September 2014, he was appointed to become vice chancellor at Muteesa I Royal University.

Other considerations
Sserwanga is a married father and of the Christian faith.

See also
 List of universities in Uganda
 List of business schools in Uganda
 List of university leaders in Uganda

References

External links
Professor Arthur Sserwanga - New Vice Chancellor, Muteesa I Royal University
 His Majesty Muwenda Mutebi II Selects Professor Arthur Sserwanga To Lead Muteesa I Royal University (Luganda).

Living people
1971 births
Ganda people
Vice-chancellors of universities in Uganda
Makerere University Business School alumni
Kyambogo University alumni
People from Wakiso District
Ugandan Christians
Ugandan accountants
Central Region, Uganda